Kamel Bidari (born 1 February 1960) is the Algerian Minister of Higher Education and Scientific Research. He was appointed as minister on 9 September 2022.

Education 
Bidari holds a Bachelor of Science (1978) from the Lycée Ben Mhidi, a Master of Geophysics (1983) from the University of Boumerdès and a PhD of Physics and Mathematics (1987) from the Academy of Sciences of the Soviet Union.

References 

Living people
1960 births
Government ministers of Algeria
Algerian politicians
21st-century Algerian politicians